The 2022 Tour de Romandie was a road cycling stage race held between 26 April and 1 May 2022 in Romandy, the French-speaking part of western Switzerland. It was the 75th edition of the Tour de Romandie and the 18th race of the 2022 UCI World Tour.

Teams 
All eighteen UCI WorldTeams, one UCI ProTeam, and the Swiss national team participated in the race. 

UCI WorldTeams

 
 
 
 
 
 
 
 
 
 
 
 
 
 
 
 
 
 

UCI ProTeams

 

National Teams

 Switzerland

Route

Stages

Prologue 
26 April 2022 — Lausanne,  (ITT)

Stage 1 
27 April 2022 — La Grande Béroche to Romont,

Stage 2 
28 April 2022 — Echallens to Echallens,

Stage 3 
29 April 2022 — Valbroye to Valbroye,

Stage 4 
30 April 2022 — Aigle to Zinal/Val d'Anniviers,

Stage 5 
1 May 2022 — Aigle to Villars,  (ITT)

Classification leadership table 

 On stage 1, Rohan Dennis, who was second in the points classification, wore the orange jersey, because first-placed Ethan Hayter wore the green jersey as the leader of the general classification.
 On stage 1, Ethan Vernon, who was second in the young rider classification, wore the white jersey, because first-placed Ethan Hayter wore the green jersey as the leader of the general classification.
 On stage 2, Dylan Teuns, who was second in the points classification, wore the orange jersey, because first-placed Rohan Dennis wore the green jersey as the leader of the general classification.

Classification standings

General classification

Points classification

Mountains classification

Young rider classification

Team classification

Notes 

As of 1 March 2022, the UCI announced that cyclists from Russia and Belarus would no longer compete under the name or flag of those respective countries due to the Russian invasion of Ukraine.

References

External links 
 

2022
2022 UCI World Tour
2022 in Swiss sport
April 2022 sports events in Switzerland